Eilif Bjarne Nedberg (born 7 September 1956) is a Norwegian luger, born in Oslo. He competed at the 1976 Winter Olympics in Innsbruck, where he placed 15th in doubles together with Martin Ore.

References

External links

1956 births
Living people
Sportspeople from Oslo
Norwegian male lugers
Olympic lugers of Norway
Lugers at the 1976 Winter Olympics